Duplicaria hiradoensis is a species of sea snail, a marine gastropod mollusk in the family Terebridae, the auger snails.

Description
The snail has an auger-shaped shell about 40–55 mm long.

Distribution

References

Terebridae
Gastropods described in 1921